This is a list of members of the Tasmanian House of Assembly between the 9 June 1934 election and the 20 February 1937 election. The 1934 election reduced the Nationalists from one of their biggest majorities ever into opposition, as Labor leader Albert Ogilvie became Premier of Tasmania. It was not until 1969 that the Nationalists' successors, the Liberals, would achieve another term of office.

Notes
  Labor MHA for Bass, Victor Shaw, died on 14 June 1936. A recount on 25 June 1936 resulted in Labor candidate John Madden being elected.

Sources
 
 Parliament of Tasmania (2006). The Parliament of Tasmania from 1856

Members of Tasmanian parliaments by term
20th-century Australian politicians